Gaines' Denmark (foaled 1851) was one of the most influential stallions in the development of the American Saddlebred.

Life

Gaines' Denmark was foaled in 1851. He was a black stallion with two white hind socks, sired by Denmark and out of a mare known as the Stevenson mare. Gaines' Denmark sired four influential sons: Washington Denmark, Diamond Denmark, Star Denmark, and Sumpter Denmark. Upon the start of the American Civil War, Gaines' Denmark was put into a cavalry troop led by Confederate General John Hunt Morgan. Although Gaines' Denmark survived the war, he did not accomplish much as a sire after it. Prior to the war, he was used as a show horse. Today, he is considered one of the progenitors of the modern American Saddlebred.

Sire line tree

Gaines' Denmark
Ashland Denmark
Billie Cromwell
Denmark Jr
Black Prince
Bronough's Denmark
Champion Denmark
Garnett's Denmark
Kentucky Prince
Kentucky Prince Jr
Old Nigger Baby
Donovan's Diamond
Lee Woolfolk
Pilot Denmark
Arabian Denmark
Star Denmark
Tuckahoe
Young Tuckahoe
Wilson Rose's Denmark
Harris Denmark
Lewis Arlington Denmark
Arlington Denmark II
Maywood
Prince Arlington
Son of Arlington Denmark
Field's Denmark
Old Tuckahoe
Tuckahoe
Washington Denmark
Captain
Conley's Forrest Denmark
Kendal's Denmark
Duryea's Denmark
Pacolet Denmark
Premium Jewel
King Raven
Prince Raven
Prince Denmark Jr
Vandal Denmark
Robinson's Denmark of Kentucky
Son of Washington Denmark
Warren Harris Denmark
Washington Denmark Jr
Ewing's Denmark
King William
Billy Denmark
Black William
Prince William
Bonnie Laddie
Clark's Bourbon Denmark
Hile's King William
Horace Greeley
Sam Denmark
Wilson's Denmark
Black Eagle
Black Squirrel
Chester Dare
Happy Dare
Beechwold Chester
King Eagle
Artist
Artist Jordan
Buckley's Artist Jr
Finis
Jacob's Royal Denmark
Ray's Artist
Rex Macey
Artist Jr
Terry's Happy Cross
Artist Montrose
Artist Wall
Artisan
Kirby's My Own
Paragon
Pott's Artist
Allen's Mark Time
Erin Artist
Happy Thought
Artist Denmark
Royal Denmark
Hall's Artist
King William II
Cromwell
Bond's Denmark Chief
Kentucky Cavalier
Bourbon Denmark
Denmark Chief
Chief Denmark
Denmark King
King Denmark
Hall's Denmark
Wallace's Denmark Chief
Cleveland
Halcorn Denmark
Hamlet
Pat
Ramey Denmark
Gex
Frank B Denmark
Victor Denmark
Hamlet Jr II
Washington
Democrat
Hector Denmark
Maslin's Kentucky Denmark
Kentucky Denmark
Dolan's Star Denmark
Pat Dolan III
Pat Washington
Dolan Denmark
Chester Denmark
Cromwell Denmark
Dandy Washington
Landmark
Trebble Denmark
Cromwell Eagle
Preston
Washington Squirrel
Denmark Chief J B
Mark Chester
Dillen Denmark
Cromwell Squirrel
Shelby Chief
Cromwell Jr
Cecil Palmer
May Duke
Arabian
Garrard
Sterling Denmark
Sterling Chief II
Tarkington's Cromwell Denmark
Franklin's Cromwell Jr
Latham's Denmark
Stonewall Jackson
Beard's Stonewall
Fann's Stonewall
Eagle Red
Ernest Stonewall
Foster's Stonewall
Gardner's Stonewall
Raleigh
Red Eagle
Eagle Red F 67
Robert E Lee
Rock-a-by
Newsom's Stonewall
Son of Stonewall Jackson
Newson's Stonewall
Ticonderoga
Old Black Prince
Bob Lee
Stonewall Jackson Jr
Conwell's Stonewall
Harry B
Old Arthur
Sailor Boy
Young Jackson
Adair Boy
McCreary
Logic
On Time
Silver King
Talmage
Gold King
Royal King
Fancy Boy
Rob Roy
Smith's Stonewall
Ashley's Stonewall
Barker's Stonewall
George
George Stonewall
Hix's Stonewall
Modrell's Stonewall
Patterson's Stonewall
Stonewall Jr
Black Snake
Fayette Denmark
Kentucky Bird
Son of Fayette Denmark
Crabb's Bourbon Denmark
Fancy Denmark
Jewel Denmark
Dolan's Dillard
Dolan's Granger
Dillard Granger
Dolan's Grey Eagle
Second Jewel
Gilt Edge
Jewel Kimble
Red Prince
Jeweler
Artist Jewel
Walking Denmark
Sandidge
Jewel King
Beau Brummel of Kenmore
Kentucky Fox
Lightfoot Brummel
Happy Beau
Jewel
Star Denmark
Denmark Halcorn
Pinque
Rolla Denmark
Whip Denmark
King Denmark
Endor
Norman
King of Denmark II
Hamlet Denmark
Prince of Denmark
Diamond Denmark
Black Donald
Bedford Brooks
Bedford Boy
Brooks
Wallace Bonesetter
Black McDonald
Crabb's Diamond Jr
Crabb's Diamond King
Diamond King
Diamond Chief
Diamond Jr
Diamond Denmark Jr
Dandy Denmark
Hollywood Denmark
Nora Harrison
Tom Diamond
Billy Diamond
Mac Diamond
Young Diamond
Montrose
Bonny Ladd
Branstetter's Montrose
Coon's Montrose
Montrose Jr
Diamond Joe
Harry Montrose
J S Marmaduke
Jack
Artist Montrose II
Joe Berry's Monte
Josephus
Son of Montrose
Josephus
Railey
Mossrose
Diamond Dillard
Stranger Boy
Mossrose Jr
Monroe Squirrel
Montrose Jr
Monte Cristo
Matchless
Woodford King
Dashwood
Monte Christo II
Red Denmark
Monte Cristo Jr
Cristo Chief
Elliston
Monte
Joel
Monte Mark
Woodland Squirrel
Billie Cristo
Coulter's Montrose Jr
Warner Montrose
Wild Rose
Chestnut Rose
Black Rose II
Moore's Montrose
Plutarch Rose
Rose Denmark
Squirrel Rose
Black Artist
Prince Rose
Star Rose
Peerless Rose
Star Rose II
Capt Thomas Ruby
Diamond Montrose
Diamond Montrose Jr
Hamilton's Montrose Jr
Hoxie
Lamb's Rosemont
Rosemont-Monsees
Black Rose
Bozyon Montrose
Income
Plantagenet
Rosemont
Star Rose-Eubanks
King Lee Rose
Rosewood II
Game
Beaumont
Mont-Rex
Montrose Superior
Montrose Superior Jr
Grand Superior
Artist Montrose Squirrel
Ortiz Rose
Billie Freeman
Colonel Clay
Ovid Clifford
Mark Diamond
Black Diamond
Dillard Denmark
Mark Denmark
Markham
Burton Cox
Woodford Denmark
Sam Fiddler
Black Diamond
Master Diamond
Yantis Diamond King
Brilliant
King Diamond
Bourbon Denmark
Diamond Denmark Jr
Diamond Denmark Jr
Grover
Mark Wilton
Mark Diamond Jr
Star Dillard Denmark
Taylor's Mark Diamond Jr
Martell
Prince Diamond
Brown Diamond
Diamond Prince
Denmark Chief
Denmark Chief Jr
Buckner Squirrel
Mark Diamond Jr
Terry's Black Diamond
King of Diamonds II
Star Black Beauty
Herzogg
Crystal Denmark
Lail's Denmark Chief
Denmark Jr
Crigler's Denmark
Rex Denmark
Rex Chief
Rex McDonald
Rex Rose Denmark
Rex Rose
Reckless Squirrel
Rex Jr
Rex Chief
Rex Denmark II
Rex Montgomery
The Colonel
Clay Rex
Rex Donnell
Rex Mont
Rex Monte Squirrel
Ned Denmark
Rex Carter
Cleveland Denmark
Piedmont
Sumpter Denmark
Banta's Sumpter Denmark Jr
Brown Bon-ton
Black Denmark
J I C Denmark
Logan Denmark
Fant's Denmark
Funk's Sumpter Denmark
Miller Lee
Kentucky Boy
Sumpter Denmark Jr
Wallace Denmark
Son of Wallace Denmark
Wallace Denmark Jr II
Wallace Denmark Jr
Young Denmark
Price's Black Denmark
Chrisman's Denmark
Banta's Denmark
Son of Banta's Denmark
Walla
Sumpter Denmark II
Ball Hornet
John Patrick's Tom Hal
Nutwood
Bon Ton
Gray Boy
Pacolet Denmark
Boen's Denmark
Pat Denmark
Pilcher Denmark
Sumpter Denmark III
Sumpter Denmark Jr
Black Sump
Prince
Royal
Banta's George
Cooper Horse

References

Individual American Saddlebreds